Anita Rau Badami (born 24 September 1961) is a Canadian writer of Indian descent. Born in Rourkela, Odisha, India, to a South Indian Kannada-speaking family, she was educated at the University of Madras and Sophia Polytechnic in Bombay. She emigrated to Canada in 1991, and earned an M.A. at the University of Calgary. Her first novel was Tamarind Mem (1997).

Her novels deal with the complexities of Indian family life and with the cultural gap that emerges when Indians move to the west. Badami's third novel, Can You Hear the Nightbird Call explores the Golden Temple Massacre and the Air India Bombing.

Badami cites as among her favourite books Midnight's Children by Salman Rushdie, Cat's Eye and Surfacing by Margaret Atwood, A House for Mr Biswas by V. S. Naipaul and Housekeeping by Marilynne Robinson.
In 2015 Badami was writer-in-residence at Athabasca University in Edmonton.  In 2016 The Hero's Walk was listed as one of the five finalists for the CBC Canada Reads competition.

In 2017, Badami was announced as chair of the 2017 Scotiabank Giller Prize jury.

Bibliography
Tamarind Mem - 1997  (U.S. title: Tamarind Woman - 2002)
The Hero's Walk - 2001 
Can You Hear the Nightbird Call? - 2006 
Tell it to the Trees- 2011

References

External links
A conversation with Anita Rau Badami 
Review of The Hero's Walk
Review of Tamarind Mem
Anita Rau Badami fan page
Records of Anita Rau Badami are held by Simon Fraser University's Special Collections and Rare Books
Recordings of Anita Rau Badami are available online in the Unarchiving the Margins Collection at Simon Fraser University's Special Collections and Rare Books

1961 births
20th-century Canadian novelists
21st-century Canadian novelists
Indian women novelists
Living people
Indian emigrants to Canada
People from Rourkela
Canadian women novelists
Canadian writers of Asian descent
Canadian people of Indian descent
English-language writers from India
Sophia College for Women alumni
20th-century Indian women writers
20th-century Indian writers
21st-century Indian women writers
21st-century Indian writers
21st-century Canadian women writers
Sophia Polytechnic alumni
Women writers from Odisha
Novelists from Odisha
Writers from Vancouver
20th-century Canadian women writers